Seonjong of Goryeo (9 October 1049 – 17 June 1094) (r. 1083–1094) was the 13th king of Goryeo. He was the second son of Empress Inye and born in September, 1049. He was sealed as marquis of Gukwon (國原侯) in March, 1056. Harmony of Confucism and Buddhism made his political statue very stable. Also he propelled broad-range trade among Song, Jurchens, Liao dynasty of Khitans, and Japan.

During his period, Buddhism in Korea grew a lot. His brother Uicheon brought 1,000 scriptures from Song and bought 4,000 scriptures from Liao, Song, and Japan. Furthermore, Seonjong founded many pagodas for Buddhist temples and presented clothing for soldiers guarding the borders. Even when bedridden due to an illness in 1092, he calmly accepted his nearing death on lieu of Buddhist virtues.

Family
Father: Munjong of Goryeo (고려 문종)
Grandfather: Hyeonjong of Goryeo (고려 현종)
Grandmother: Queen Wonhye (원혜왕후)
Mother: Queen Inye (인예왕후)
Grandfather: Yi Ja-yeon (이자연)
Grandmother: Lady, of the Gyeongju Gim clan (부인 경주 김씨)
Consorts and their Respective issue(s):
Worthy Consort Jeongsin of the Incheon Yi clan (정신현비 이씨); maternal second cousin.
Princess Yeonhwa (연화공주)
Queen Sasuk of the Incheon Yi clan (사숙왕후 이씨; d. 1107); maternal first cousin.
Crown Prince Wang Uk (태자 왕욱)
Princess Suan (수안택주)
Princess Wang (공주 왕씨)
Princess Wonsin of the Incheon Yi clan (원신궁주 이씨); maternal first cousin.
Wang Yun, Marquess Hansan (왕윤 한산후)
Unknown
Prince Wang (왕자 왕씨)
Prince Wang (왕자 왕씨)

See also
List of Korean monarchs
List of Goryeo people
Goryeo

References

1049 births
1094 deaths
11th-century Korean monarchs
Korean Buddhist monarchs
11th-century Korean poets
People from Kaesong